Witherspoon v. Illinois, 391 U.S. 510 (1968), was a U.S. Supreme Court case where the court ruled that a state statute providing the state unlimited challenge for cause of jurors who might have any objection to the death penalty gave too much bias in favor of the prosecution.

The Court said,

The decision in this case would cause the Supreme Court of California to order a retrial on the penalty phase in the 1972 case of California v. Anderson, and when the case was heard for the third time, would find the imposition of the death penalty was unconstitutional on the grounds of the penalty being cruel or unusual punishment, in violation of the State Constitution.  The decision would become national in scale when the U.S. Supreme Court also in 1972 ruled in Furman v. Georgia that all death penalty cases were in violation of the 8th Amendment's prohibition on cruel and unusual punishment.

Death
Witherspoon died at his home in Detroit, Michigan on Sunday March 4, 1990 after a battle with cancer.

See also
 List of United States Supreme Court cases, volume 391

References

External links
 
 

United States Supreme Court cases
United States Supreme Court cases of the Warren Court
Cruel and Unusual Punishment Clause and death penalty case law
United States Sixth Amendment jury case law
Capital punishment in Illinois
1968 in United States case law